John Steen Olsen (born 4 January 1943) is a Danish former footballer. He played for Hvidovre IF, Boston Beacons, VV DOS, FC Utrecht, Feyenoord and IFK Malmö during his active career.

After his career, he worked as a scout for Ajax in Scandinavia, bringing players such as Zlatan Ibrahimović, Viktor Fischer, Christian Eriksen, Michael Laudrup and Kasper Dolberg to Amsterdam.

References

External links

Danish men's footballers
Living people
1943 births
Association football forwards
Association football midfielders
Denmark international footballers
Hvidovre IF players
Boston Beacons players
FC Utrecht players
Feyenoord players
IFK Malmö Fotboll players
AFC Ajax non-playing staff
Footballers from Copenhagen
Eredivisie players
North American Soccer League (1968–1984) players
Danish expatriate men's footballers
Expatriate soccer players in the United States
Expatriate footballers in the Netherlands
Expatriate footballers in Sweden
Danish expatriate sportspeople in Sweden
Danish expatriate sportspeople in the Netherlands
Danish expatriate sportspeople in the United States